Euro gold and silver commemorative coins are special euro coins minted and issued by member states of the Eurozone, mainly in gold and silver, although other precious metals are also used in rare occasions. Belgium was one of the first twelve countries in the Eurozone that introduced the euro (€) on 1 January 2002. Since then, the Belgian Royal Mint have been minting both normal issues of Belgian euro coins, which are intended for circulation, and commemorative euro coins in gold and silver.

These special coins are only legal tender in Belgium, unlike the normal issues of the Belgian euro coins, which are legal tender in every country of the Eurozone. This means that the commemorative coins made of gold and silver cannot be used as money in other countries. Furthermore, as their bullion value generally vastly exceeds their face value, these coins are not intended to be used as means of payment at all—although it remains possible. For this reason, they are usually named Collectors' coins.

The coins usually commemorate the anniversaries of historical events or draw attention to current events of special importance. Belgium mints five of these coins on average per year, in both gold and silver, with face value ranging from 10 to 100 euros. All the coins were designed by Luc Luycx.

Summary 

As of 3 July 2008, 27 variations of Belgian commemorative coins have been minted: two in 2002, two in 2003, four in 2004, four in 2005, six in 2006, six in 2007, seven in 2008 and two in 2009 so far. These special high-value commemorative coins are not to be confused with €2 commemorative coins, which are coins designated for circulation and do have legal tender status in all countries of the Eurozone.

The following table shows the number of coins minted per year. In the first section, the coins are grouped by the metal used, while in the second section they are grouped by their face value.

2002 coinage

2003 coinage

2004 coinage

2005 coinage

2006 coinage

2007 coinage

2008 coinage

2009 coinage

2010 coinage

2011 coinage

2012 coinage

Notes 

Belgium
Coins of Belgium